Nalanda Open University (NOU) is a university at Patna in Bihar state, India. It is the only university in Bihar providing education through distance and open education. Nalanda Open University Degree/Diploma /Certificates are eligible for higher studies, public & private sector employment and service promotions. It is recognized by University Grants Commission (UGC). It is a member of Association of Indian Universities which is mainly concerned with the recognition of degrees/diplomas awarded by the Universities in India, which are recognized by the University Grants Commission, New Delhi, and abroad for the purpose of admission to higher degree courses in Indian Universities. It is an open university which means that it follows an open-door academic policy and is open to everyone for admission with minimum requirements.

It is the second largest open university in India after Indira Gandhi National Open University (IGNOU).

It is at present functioning from its camp office which is located at Biscomaun Bhawan, 2nd, 3rd, 4th and 12th Floors, Patna-800001. However, it is in the process of setting up its own campus after UGC made it mandatory for all universities in India to have their own campuses. New campus of Nalanda Open University is being constructed at Rajgir, Nalanda, Bihar adjacent to the ancient ruins of Nalanda. The campus is expected to be around 40 acres in area, with building having 1.10-lakh square feet built up space, and it is as per the requirement of UGC. However, as of February 2021, only 10 acres has been made available to it and talks are ongoing between the Bihar Government and University regarding the remaining 30 acres of land. It was expected to be completely built by August 2020 but because of the effects of Covid-19, the construction work got delayed and now it is likely to be ready by March 2022 when the University would shift there.

In 2020, it became the first university in the state of Bihar to adopt the University Management Information System (UMIS) and with this, all processes related to admissions, examinations and publication of results has been made online.

History

The university was established in March 1987 by an ordinance issued by the Government of Bihar. It is the only university in the state of Bihar meant for imparting education exclusively through distance education. In 1995, the Nalanda Open University Act was passed by the legislature of Bihar replacing the earlier ordinance, and this university thereafter came under the authority and jurisdiction of the passed act. It is named after the famous Buddhist Nalanda University of Nalanda, the ancient seat of learning.

Courses
Degree courses at the undergraduate level and degree as well as diploma courses at the post-graduate level are offered. Certificate courses for 6 or 9 months are provided. Nalanda Open University is the only university where courses on Bihari languages (Magahi, Bhojpuri, Maithili) are offered.

Post-graduate degree programs

NOU offers a Master of Arts (M.A) in Magahi, Bhojpuri, Rural Development, Economics, Geography, Hindi, History, Political Science, Psychology, Sociology, Public Administration, Journalism & Mass Communication, Education and Urdu.

The university offers a Master of Science in Geography, Botany, Zoology, Chemistry, Physics and Mathematics. It offers Master of Computer Application (MCA), Master of Library & Information Science (One Year Course), and Master in Commerce (M.Com).

Post-graduate diploma programmes

The university offers post-graduate diploma programmes in Marketing Management, Financial Management, Journalism and Mass Communication, Yogic Studies and Disaster Management.

Graduate or degree programmes

The university offers B.A. Honours in Economics, Hindi, History, Political Science, Psychology, Sociology, Social Work, Geography, Tourism, and Home Science.

NOU offers Bachelor of Science (Honours) in  Botany, Chemistry, Geography, Mathematics, Physics, Zoology, and Home Science.

It offers Bachelor of Commerce, Bachelor of Library and Information Science (one-year course), and Bachelor of Computer Applications.

Intermediate programmes

Intermediate of Art
Intermediate of Commerce
Intermediate of Science

Certificate programmes

The university offers a nine-month certificate programme in Computing, Library Science, Clinical Dental Technique, Dental and Oral Hygiene, ECG Technique, Laboratory Technique, Medical Laboratory Technique, Physiotherapy and Yoga Therapy, and Operation Theatre Assistant.

It offers a six-month programme in the languages of Magahi, Bhojpuri, Maithili, Pali, Prakrit, Sanskrit, Urdu and the fields of Disaster Management, Indian Constitution and Panchayati Raj, Abolition of Child Labour, Bio-fertilizer Production, Buddhist Studies, Jain Studies, Child and Women Rights, Child Psychology and Guidance, Christian Studies, Environment Studies, Floriculture Technology, Health and Environment, Food and Nutrition, HIV and Family Education, Insurance Services, Hindu Studies, Islamic Studies, Sikh Studies, Legal awareness among Women, Medicinal and Aromatic Plant, Nutrition and Child Care and Soil Health Management.

NOU also offers a four-week certification programme in Home Usages of Computers.

Schools

School of  Computer Education and Information Technology
School of Economics, Commerce and Management
School of  Health and Environmental Science
School of  Indian and Foreign Languages
School of Indology
School of Journalism and Mass Communication
School of  Library and Information Science
School of  Pure and Agricultural Sciences
School of Social Sciences
School of  Teacher's Education

Recognition
NOU is a state open university duly established by an act of legislature of Bihar and is recognised by the Distance Education Council, IGNOU, Maidan Garhi, New Delhi.

Nalanda Open University Degrees/Diplomas/Certificates are eligible for higher studies, public & private sector employment and service promotions.

See also 
 List of universities in India
 Universities and colleges in India
 Education in India
 Education in Bihar
 Distance Education Council
 University Grants Commission (India)

References

External links
Nalanda Open University

Open universities in India
Universities in Patna
Educational institutions established in 1987
1987 establishments in Bihar